Hohenfels is a municipality in Konstanz district, in Baden-Württemberg, Germany.

Geography
It includes the villages of Deutwang, Kalkofen, Liggersdorf, Mindersdorf, and Selgetsweiler.

History

In 1352 the Swabian lordship of Hohenfels around the 12th century New Hohenfels Castle was inherited by the noble House of Jungingen. Konrad von Jungingen (c. 1355–1407) and his brother Ulrich (1360–1410) served as Grand Masters of the Teutonic Knights; in 1506 the Teutonic Order purchased the Lordship of Hohenfels, which became part of the Altshausen commandry within the Alsace-Burgundy bailiwick.

After the German mediatisation in 1803, Hohenfels fell to the Principality of Hohenzollern-Sigmaringen and from 1850 was part of the Prussian Province of Hohenzollern.

People 
 Korbinian Brodmann (1868-1918), neurologist
Christa Ludwig (* 1949), writer

References

Konstanz (district)